The FA Women's National League Southern Premier Division is a league in the third level in the women's football pyramid in England, along with the Northern division. These two divisions are part of the FA Women's National League and below the Women's Super League and Women's Championship.

The league is played on a home and away basis, with each team playing each other twice, and points being awarded in the standard three points for a win format. The bottom two clubs are relegated, also on a geographical basis, to the Division One South West, and Division One South East. The winner plays the winner of the Northern Premier League winner to determine an overall National League champion who is promoted to the Championship.

Southern Premier Division teams are eligible to play in the Women's National League Cup as well as the Women's FA Cup.

Name
It was known as the 'Women's Premier League Southern Division' before the 2018–19 season.

Current teams (2022–23 season)

Previous winners 

From the 2014–15 season onwards, the club promoted to the Women's Championship (via a play-off between the Northern and Southern division champions), and overall champions of the FA Women's National League, are marked in bold.

See also
Women's association football
List of women's football teams
International competitions in women's association football

References

External links
The FA Women's Page

2
3
Sports leagues established in 1992
Third level women's association football leagues in Europe